Victoria Point is a coastal locality in Redland City, Queensland, Australia.

Geography 
It is primarily a residential area, but it also contains other public complexes and a ferry service to Coochiemudlo Island. The Cleveland-Redland Bay Road runs through from north to south.

History 
Redland Bay Provisional School opened on 13 November 1877 and in 1880 was renamed Victoria Point Provisional School. When a separate Redland Bay Provisional School opened on 14 December 1881, the two school operated on a half-time basis, sharing a teacher between them until Victoria Point Provisional School became a full time school again with its own teacher on 15 May 1882. In 1916 a new school building was built on a new site and it opened as Victoria Point State School.

St Anne's Anglican Church was dedicated circa 1963. It closed circa 1988.

Redlands Luthern Primary School (also known as Faith Primary School) opened on 24 January 1982 on land in Link Road, donated by Wally Hauser. It was established by three Lutheran congregations from Cleveland, Redland Bay and Mount Cotton. There were 64 students in Years 1 to 4 and 3 teachers in the school's first year, expanding to offering Years 1 to 7 by the school's third year of operation. The primary school had expected to become a feeder school to the Redeemer Lutheran College, but when that was not possible, it was decided to expand the school to also offer secondary education. Land on Beveridge Road in Thornlands was purchased and the secondary campus of the renamed Faith Lutheran College, Redlands opened on 28 January 2003. The first group of Year 12s graduated in November 2007.

In 1993, St Rita's Catholic Primary School opened in the tradition of the Augustinian Fathers offering preschool to Year 2 and attracted 92 students.

Victoria Point State High School opened on 28 January 1997.

The Victoria Point public library opened in 2006.

In 2007, there was a growing elderly population with six retirement villages currently in the suburb.

The median age of the Victoria Point population was 45 years, 7 years above the national median of 38.  74% of people living in Victoria Point were born in Australia. The other top responses for country of birth were England 7.3%, New Zealand 5.1%, South Africa 1.3%, Scotland 0.8%, Netherlands 0.5%.  91% of people spoke only English at home; the next most common languages were 0.3% German, 0.3% Afrikaans, 0.2% Spanish, 0.2% Italian, 0.2% Punjabi.

Heritage listings 
There is one heritage listing in Victoria Point, “Monkani” at 11 Point O’Halloran Road.

Amenities 
The area also hosts the Eprapah, the Charles S. Snow Scout Environment Training Centre, an area of bushland for the environmental education for members of the Scout and Guide movements.  Eprapah Creek separates Victoria Point to the north from the next suburb of Thornlands.

The headland has two boat ramps for boat entry to Moreton Bay and a Volunteer Marine Rescue unit. Beach areas include Thompson's Beach, a small child safe beach which has a very shallow slope allowing a long tide.  Shopping facilities have expanded rapidly in the last few years, with now four supermarkets, cinema complex and many specialty shops and lakeside restaurants. The Redland City Council operates a public library at Lakeside Shopping Centre, 7-15 Bunker Road. It also operates a mobile library service which visits Boat Street.

Education
Victoria Point is home to four schools, two state and two private.

Victoria Point State School is a government primary (Prep-6) school for boys and girls at School Road. In 2017, the school had an enrolment of 520 students with  38 teachers (33 full-time equivalent) and 27 non-teaching staff (15 full-time equivalent). It includes a special education program.

St Rita's Primary School is a Catholic primary (Prep-6) school for boys and girls at 39 Benfer Road. In 2017, the school had an enrolment of 535 students with  38 teachers (32 full-time equivalent) and 23 non-teaching staff (15 full-time equivalent). The school operates its own church.

Faith Lutheran College is a private primary (Prep-6) school for boys and girls at 132 Link Road. In 2017, the school had an enrolment of 840 students with  66 teachers (60 full-time equivalent) and 64 non-teaching staff (32 full-time equivalent).

Victoria Point State High School is a government secondary (7-12) school for boys and girls at 93-131 Benfer Road. In 2017, the school had an enrolment of 1155 students with  95 teachers (89 full-time equivalent) and 41 non-teaching staff (32 full-time equivalent). It includes a special education program.

Media 
Victoria Point is serviced by community radio station BayFM.

Sporting clubs
The Redland Australian Football Club, often referred to as the Redlands Bombers, competes in the North East Australian Football League and provides many sporting opportunities for the area.

References

External links

 University of Queensland: Queensland Places: Victoria Point

Suburbs of Redland City
Coastline of Queensland
Localities in Queensland